Eois is a genus of moths in the family Geometridae. The genus contains about 250 validly described species, most from the Neotropical region. Many species are still undescribed and the total number of species is estimated to be over a 1,000 in the Neotropical region alone. The genus was first described by Jacob Hübner in 1818.

Species

References

External links

 
Asthenini
Geometridae genera